Zein is a class of prolamine protein found in maize.

Zein may also refer to:

Persons
Zein is a common Arabic name and family name. Notable people with the given name or surname include:

First name
Princess Zein bint Al Hussein, the sister of King Abdullah II of Jordan
Zein al-Abidin Ben Ali (1936–2019), Tunisian politician, President of Tunisia
Zein al-Sharaf Talal, the Queen of Jordan and wife of King Talal
Zein E. Obagi, Syrian-American dermatologist 
Zein Pun, a court official at the Martaban Palace of Hanthawaddy Kingdom, who seized the throne for seven days in 1331

Middle name
Sultan Mizan Zainal Abidin, reigning sultan of Terengganu. He is also the 13th Yang di-Pertuan Agong of Malaysia
Ahmed Zein El-Abidin, Egyptian Olympic fencer
Intisar el-Zein Soughayroun, Sudanese professor of archeology
Mohamed Zein Tahan (born 1990), Lebanese footballer

Family name
Zein
Ahmad Zein, Yemeni writer and journalist
Ali Zein (born 1990), Egyptian handball player
Haitham Zein, Lebanese footballer
Hussein Zein, Lebanese footballer
Irfandy Zein (born 1995), Indonesian footballer
Maha Zein (born 1976), Egyptian squash player
Melhem Zein, Lebanese singer
Saw Zein, the fourth king of Hanthawaddy Pegu from 1324 to 1331

Al Zein
Mahmoud Al-Zein, nicknamed "the president of Berlin", an organised crime boss in Germany

El Zein
Abdel Latif El Zein, Lebanese politician
Ahmad Ali El Zein, Lebanese novelist and journalist
Ahmed Aref El-Zein, Shi’a intellectual from the Jabal Amil area of South Lebanon
Johny El Zein (born 1992), known as Zein, Cypriot/Belizean professional footballer
Judith El Zein (born 1976), French actress
Kassem El Zein (born 1990), Lebanese footballer
Omar El-Zein (born 1985), German footballer

Other uses
Zein, superhero character in AK Comics
Zein TV, Arab satellite TV channel, a joint venture between Future TV and Dubai Media City
The Wedding of Zein, 1962 novel by Sudanese author Tayeb Salih

See also
Zain (disambiguation)
Zayn (disambiguation)
Zayn ad-Din (disambiguation)